"Heartbreak Express" is a song written and recorded by American entertainer Dolly Parton. It was released in May 1982 as the second single and title track from her album Heartbreak Express.  The song peaked at number 7 on the U.S. country chart.

Content
The song tells the story of a woman who bids farewell to a failed relationship and departs on the "Heartbreak Express".

Chart performance

References

External links
Heartbreak Express lyrics at Dolly Parton On-Line

1982 singles
1982 songs
Dolly Parton songs
Songs written by Dolly Parton
RCA Records singles